Agnosia is the inability to process sensory information. Often there is a loss of ability to recognize objects, persons, sounds, shapes, or smells while the specific sense is not defective nor is there any significant memory loss. It is usually associated with brain injury or neurological illness, particularly after damage to the occipitotemporal border, which is part of the ventral stream.  Agnosia only affects a single modality, such as vision or hearing. More recently, a top-down interruption is considered to cause the disturbance of handling perceptual information.

Types

Visual agnosia
Visual agnosia is a broad category that refers to a deficiency in the ability to recognize visual objects. Visual agnosia can be further subdivided into two different subtypes: apperceptive visual agnosia and associative visual agnosia.

Individuals with apperceptive visual agnosia display the ability to see contours and outlines when shown an object, but they experience difficulty if asked to categorize objects. Apperceptive visual agnosia is associated with damage to one hemisphere, specifically damage to the posterior sections of the right hemisphere.

In contrast, individuals with associative visual agnosia experience difficulty when asked to name objects. Associative agnosia is associated with damage to both the right and left hemispheres at the occipitotemporal border.  A specific form of associative visual agnosia is known as prosopagnosia.  Prosopagnosia is the inability to recognize faces.  For example, these individuals have difficulty recognizing friends, family and coworkers. However, individuals with prosopagnosia can recognize all other types of visual stimuli.

Speech agnosia

Speech agnosia, or auditory verbal agnosia, refers to "an inability to comprehend spoken words despite intact hearing, speech production and reading ability". Patients report that they hear sounds being produced, but that the sounds are fundamentally unrecognizable or untranslatable.

 EXAMINER: What did you eat for breakfast?
 PATIENT: Breakfast, breakfast, it sounds familiar but it doesn't speak to me. (Obler & Gjerlow 1999:45)

Despite an inability to process what the speaker is saying, some patients have been reported to recognize certain characteristic information about the speaker's voice (such as being a man or woman).

Causes
Agnosia can result from strokes, dementia, or other neurological disorders. It may also be trauma-induced by a head injury, brain infection, or hereditary.  Additionally, some forms of agnosia may be the result of developmental disorders. Damage causing agnosia usually occurs in either the occipital or parietal lobes of the brain.  Although one modality may be affected, cognitive abilities in other areas are preserved.

Patients who experience dramatic recovery from blindness experience significant to total agnosia.

The effect of damage to the superior temporal sulcus is consistent with several types of neurolinguistic deficiencies, and some contend that agnosia is one of them. The superior temporal sulcus is vital for speech comprehension because the region is highly involved with the lexical interface. According to the 1985 TRACE II Model, the lexical interface associates sound waves (phonemes) with morphological features to produce meaningful words. This association process is accomplished by lateral inhibition/excitement of certain words within an individual's lexicon (vocabulary). For instance, if an experimenter were to say DOG aloud, the utterance would activate and inhibit various words within the subjects lexical interface:
 DOG activates 3, and inhibits 0 letters in DOG. – +3
 DOG activates 2, and inhibits 1 letters in FOG. – +2
 DOG activates 1, and inhibits 2 letters in DAN. – +1
The consistency of this model to agnosia is shown by evidence that bilateral lesions to the superior temporal sulcus produces 'pure word deafness' (Kussmaul, 1877), or as it is understood today, speech agnosia. Patients with pure word deafness demonstrate the inability to recognize and process speech sounds with normal auditory processing for non-speech sounds below the level of the cortex.

Diagnosis
In order to assess an individual for agnosia, it must be verified that the individual does not have a loss of sensation, and that both their language abilities and intelligence are intact.  In order for an individual to be diagnosed with agnosia, they must only be experiencing a sensory deficit in a single modality.  To make a diagnosis, the distinction between apperceptive and associative agnosia must be made.  This distinction can be made by having the individual complete copying and matching tasks.  If the individual has a form of apperceptive agnosia they will not be able to match two stimuli that are identical in appearance.  In contrast, if an individual has a form of associative agnosia, they will not be able to match different examples of a stimulus.  For example, an individual who has been diagnosed with associative agnosia in the visual modality would not be able to match pictures of a laptop that is open with a laptop that is closed.

Pure alexia
Individuals with pure alexia usually have difficulty reading words as well as difficulty with identifying letters.  In order to assess whether an individual has pure alexia, tests of copying and recognition must be performed. An individual with pure alexia should be able to copy a set of words, and should be able to recognize letters.

Prosopagnosia
Individuals are usually shown pictures of human faces that may be familiar to them such as famous actors, singers, politicians or family members.  The pictures shown to the patient are selected to be age and culture appropriate.  The task involves the examiner asking the individual to name each face.  If the individual cannot name whose face appears in the picture, the examiner may ask a question that would help to recognize the face in the picture.

Treatment
For all practical purposes, there is no direct cure. Patients may improve if information is presented in other modalities than the damaged one. Different types of therapies can help to reverse the effects of agnosia. In some cases, occupational therapy or speech therapy can improve agnosia, depending on its cause.

Initially many individuals with a form of agnosia are unaware of the extent to which they have either a perceptual or recognition deficit.  This may be caused by anosognosia which is the lack of awareness of a deficit.  This lack of awareness usually leads to a form of denial and resistance to any form of help or treatment.  There are various methods that can be used which can help the individual recognize the impairment in perception or recognition that they may have.  A patient can be presented with a stimulus to the impaired modality only to help increase their awareness of their deficit.  Alternatively, a task can be broken down into its component parts so that the individual can see each part of the problem caused by the deficit.  Once the individual acknowledges their perceptual or recognition deficit, a form of treatment may be recommended.  There are various forms of treatment such as compensatory strategies with alternate modalities, verbal strategies, alternate cues and organizational strategies.

Verbal strategies

Using verbal descriptions may be helpful for individuals with certain types of agnosia.  Individuals such as prosopagnosics may find it useful to listen to a description of their friend or family member and recognize them based on this description more easily than through visual cues.

Alternate cues

Alternate cues may be particularly useful to an individual with environmental agnosia or prosopagnosia.  Alternate cues for an individual with environmental agnosia may include color cues or tactile markers to symbolize a new room or to remember an area by.  Prosopagnosics may use alternate cues such as a scar on an individual's face or crooked teeth in order to recognize the individual. Hair color and length can be helpful cues as well.

Organizational strategies

Organizational strategies may be extremely helpful for an individual with visual agnosia.  For example, organizing clothes according to different hangers provides tactile cues for the individual, making it easier to identify certain forms of clothing as opposed to relying solely on visual cues.

Alternative medicine
These strategies elicit the use of an unaffected modality.  For example, visual agnosics can use tactile information in replacement of visual information.  Alternatively, an individual with prosopagnosia can use auditory information in order to replace visual information.  For example, an individual with prosopagnosia can wait for someone to speak, and will usually recognize the individual from their speech.

Current research
There are clinical trials being done to further research for treatments. At the National Institute of Neurological Disorders and Stroke (NINDS) they support research for rare diseases like agnosia. Some organizations that are recruiting for trials are using clincaltrials.gov and give status updates on the trials.

History 
The term 'agnosia'  comes from the Ancient Greek ἀγνωσία (agnosia), "ignorance", "absence of knowledge". It was introduced by Sigmund Freud in 1891: "For disturbances in the recognition of objects, which Finkelnburg classes as asymbolia, I should like to propose the term 'agnosia'." Prior to Freud's introduction of the term, some of the first ideas about agnosia came from Carl Wernicke, who created theories about receptive aphasia in 1874.  He noted that individuals with receptive aphasia did not possess the ability to understand speech or repeat words.  He believed that receptive aphasia was due to lesions of the posterior third of the left superior temporal gyrus.  Due to these lesions, Wernicke believed that individuals with receptive aphasia had a limited deafness for certain sounds and frequencies in speech.

After Wernicke, came Kussmaul in 1877 who attempted to explain why auditory verbal agnosia, also known as word deafness, occurs.  Contrary to Wernicke's explanations, Kussmaul believed auditory verbal agnosia was the result of major destruction to the first left temporal gyrus.  Kussmaul also posited about the origins of alexia (acquired dyslexia) also known as word blindness.  He believed that word blindness was the result of lesions to the left angular and supramarginal gyri.

Heinrich Lissauer shared his ideas about agnosia after Wernicke and Kussmaul. In 1890, he theorized that there were two ways in which object recognition impairment could occur.  One way in which impairment could occur was if there was damage to early perceptual processing or if there was damage to the actual object representation.  If the actual object representation was damaged, this would not allow the object to be stored in visual memory, and therefore the individual would not be able to recognize the object.  During the time of Wernicke, Kussmaul and Lissauer there was little known about the cerebral cortex.  Today, with new neuroimaging techniques, we have been able to expand our knowledge on agnosia greatly.

References

External links

 Types and brain areas
 Total Recall: Memory Requires More than the Sum of Its Parts Scientific American (accessdate 2007-06-05)

 
Medical terminology
Symptoms and signs: Nervous system